"Better Things" is a song by The Kinks, released as a single in June 1981 in the UK and November 1981 in the US. A slightly shorter version was later released on their album Give the People What They Want.

Written about Ray Davies's failing marriage, the song originated during the Low Budget sessions. The song was completed in 1981 and released as a single, reaching number 46 in the UK and number 92 in America. The single marked the band's first appearance in the UK charts since 1972.

In 2011 American Songwriter named "Better Things" their Favorite Break Up Song.

Background
"Better Things" was penned by Ray Davies in New York City about the "impending split" from his second wife, Yvonne. Davies told Jeff Tamarkin of The Aquarian Weekly that the time when the song was written was a "depressing" time for him.

The song dates back to the sessions of the Low Budget album, during which an early version of the song was attempted. The song was later recorded for Give the People What They Want in April 1981, with the recording session dubbed by Ray Davies as "a total send-up."

Release and reception
The track was released as the lead single for the album in the UK. Initial copies came with a bonus 7" containing live versions of "Lola" and "David Watts" recorded on American tours in 1979 and 1980. The UK B-side was a non-LP song "Massive Reductions" (a different, shorter version of "Massive Reductions" was released on the band's 1984 album Word of Mouth). Although "Better Things" missed the top 40, it did reach #46 and was their first charting single since "Supersonic Rocket Ship" in 1972.

In the U.S., "Destroyer" was released in September as the album's lead single with "Better Things" as the second single in November. "Better Things" reached #12 on the Billboard Rock Top Tracks chart and #92 on the Billboard Hot 100, slightly lower than "Destroyer".

In September 2010, Ray Davies released "See My Friends", an album of reworked classic Kinks songs, which contains a duet of "Better Things" with Bruce Springsteen.

Chart performance

Covers
 Pearl Jam recorded a version of the song and released it on side A of their 2011 fan club single.
 The American punk-rock band Bouncing Souls covered the song in their album The Gold Record.
 Dar Williams covered the song on her album End of the Summer.
 Fountains of Wayne covered the song on Late Night with Conan O'Brien ten days after the 9/11 terrorist attacks. Their version of the song later appeared on This Is Where I Belong - The Songs of Ray Davies & The Kinks, a tribute CD released on 2 April 2002. 
 Members of Counting Crows covered the song on their live "Devil and the Bunny Show" at New Orleans' Shim Sham club on 5 May 2003. The recording exists on various bootlegs but was never publicly released.
 Frank Black recorded a cover version in 1996 as a B side from "The Marsist" 7" (from his album The Cult of Ray)
 Marky Ramone and The Intruders included their own version in their 1996 debut album of the same name.

Mixtape usage
"Better Things" is one of the songs protagonist Beverly Moody needs to track down in the 2021 Netflix comedy film Mixtape.

"Sprung" usage"
The song is used for the finale montage in Greg Garcia 2022 COVID-comedy "Sprung"

References

The Kinks songs
Songs written by Ray Davies
Song recordings produced by Ray Davies
1981 singles
Arista Records singles
1981 songs